The Broad Street Historic District in Augusta, Georgia is a  historic district that was listed on the National Register of Historic Places (NRHP) in 1980. It includes 158 contributing buildings.

The Historic District portion of Broad Street stretches from 13th to 5th Streets. Starting at 13th Street (U.S. Route 25 Business/Georgia State Route 4), Broad Street picks up the US 25 Business designation. This section has double-sided median parking. At 11th Street, the open parking in the median ends and a shaded, submerged parking pit in the median begins. This is Broad Street at its widest point. At the intersection with 6th Street, the chamber of commerce building can be found in the median.

Notable buildings

 Imperial Theatre
 Lamar Building, at 753 Broad Street, a building which is separately NRHP-listed.
 Miller Theater — reopened in January 2018
 News Building — home of The Augusta Chronicle

Haunted Pillar

The Haunted Pillar was a landmark left standing near the remains of a farmer's market that once stood at 5th and Broad Streets in downtown Augusta, Georgia. The market stood from 1830 until February 7, 1878, when it was destroyed by a tornado. A year later, the column was moved to the opposite corner of what is now 5th Street and used to display advertisements by Theodore Eye's Broad Street Grocery. In 1930, the town of Augusta hired a press agency to help stimulate its economy. The New York City-based firm AuLockhart International, Inc. was hired and given a budget of $37,500 to $50,000 to create and publish an advertising campaign aimed at attracting tourists. The firm published a ghost story about the pillar in newspapers across the country. The story refers to the pillar as “The Haunted Pillar.”

According to local folk-lore, a preacher who was denied the right to preach there, "... threatened that a great wind would destroy the place except for one pillar and that whoever tried to remove this remaining pillar would be struck dead," according to a person interviewed by The Augusta Chronicle.

The market was located directly in the middle of Broad Street, and once it was removed Augustans were reluctant to build there again. "Now that the Market House is in ruins, we think it may be opportune to suggest that it never be rebuilt upon the same spot. It was, at best, an unsightly edifice and marred the grand boulevard upon which it was mistakenly located," said an article in The Augusta Chronicle a week after the market was destroyed.

On December 17, 2016, the pillar was destroyed in a car collision.

See also

 Augusta Downtown Historic District
 History of Augusta, Georgia

References

External links
Broad Street Artists' Row
Gallery on the Row — various artists

Historic districts on the National Register of Historic Places in Georgia (U.S. state)
Geography of Augusta, Georgia
History of Augusta, Georgia
U.S. Route 25
National Register of Historic Places in Augusta, Georgia